John Leslie Gainsford (August 4, 1938 –  November 18, 2015) was a South African rugby union player. He was born in Germiston.  Gainsford played in 71 matches for South Africa (the Springboks), including tour games, and was known for being the most-capped Springbok centre until his record was overtaken by Japie Mulder in 2001.

Early life 
Gainsford grew up in Lansdowne, Cape Town. He was the eldest of four children. His mother, Enid Francis Gainsford, was Australian. She was a former Sydney swimming champion who came out to South Africa with her mother, when her mother was sent to South Africa to help train women factory workers for the Second World War effort. She met his South African father, John Cecil Gainsford, and moved to South Africa permanently.

Gainsford attended Lansdowne High School (now Windsor High School) from 1951-1955. He was a versatile and dedicated young sportsman throughout his school career, earning full colours for both rugby and athletics. He played cricket for the First XI. He excelled as a sprinter and shot-putter. He captained the school’s first team in his final year, and played for  Villager’s under-19  team during the school holidays.

Rugby career 
Gainsford made his debut for Western Province at the age of 19. 

Nice Guys Come Second is the title of his autobiography- and that says it all about both the man and the player. Winners take all, was his approach to rugby, and Doc Craven said about him, “John was one who never apologised for his belief that rugby was played to be won.” 

He would attack with great determination and, with his physical power and blistering speed for a big man of over six feet tall, his opponents found it a daunting task to contain him. Quick off the mark, Gainsford could burst past the inside of his opponent or fly past him on the outside break, leaving him hopelessly stranded.

Teammate H.O. de Villiers said of him, “John’s speed, brawn and exceptional elusiveness for a man his size were major assets, but I think the real strength of the man was his almost arrogant confidence and his incredibly powerful competitive drive. He believed there was nobody better than him and simply made it his business to transform that belief into reality.”

International rugby career 
Before making his international debut, Gainsford was chosen for the Junior Springbok tour to the Argentine in 1959. He scored 6 tries on the Junior Springbok tour, and in the following year, he made his Springbok debut against Scotland in Port Elizabeth. From April 1960 to July 1967, South Africa played a total of 34 International matches. Gainsford participated in 33 of these tests, missing only one through injury. This was against Ireland at Newlands in 1961.He scored two tries during the 1962 British Lions tour that contributed to South Africa's 3-0 series victory. He scored a total of 24 points for the national team. Gainsford played his last test in 1967, in Johannesburg against the visiting French team. He scored eight test tries and held the record of 33 Tests during his retirement.

Coaching 
After retiring from the game, Gainsford became a member of the Western Province Rugby Union executive. In 1968, he became a Western Province under-20 selector, and started coaching Villager's under-20 teams. In 1969, he became the coach for the Western Province's under-20 team. Some of the Western Province Currie Cup squad players that he coached included Springboks Morne du Plessis, Dawie Snyman, Peter Whipp, Johan Oosthuizen, Robert Cockrell, Dugald Macdonald, Wilhelm Landman, Kobus Immelmann, and Doug Claxton.  In 1971, he was made a senior Western Province selector.

Logans 
In 1963, Gainsford went into business with friend and teammate, Dave Stewart,  and Jan Pickard. They bought the established sports shop, Logans (now known as "Sportsman's Warehouse") from Jack Logan. Gainsford, Stewart, Pickard, and Jack Logan's nephew, Eric Logan, a South African soccer player, all became directors.

Personal life 
He married Shona Gainsford in 1964, and together they raised their four children in Paarl.

Gainsford passed away in Paarl, at age 77 in November 2015 following a long battle with cancer. He is survived by his wife Shona, four children, and eleven grandchildren.

Statistics

Test match record

References

2015 deaths
1938 births
South African rugby union players
South Africa international rugby union players
Rugby union centres
Western Province (rugby union) players
Rugby union players from Germiston